Indie is a short form of "independence" or "independent"; it may refer to:

Arts, entertainment, and media

Gaming
Independent video game development, video games created without financial backing from large companies
Indie game, any game (board-based, video, or otherwise) published or produced outside mainstream means; a subset of third party game
Indie Fund, an organization created by several independent game developers to help fund budding indie video game development
Indie Game Jam, an effort to rapidly prototype video game designs and inject new ideas into the game industry
Indie role-playing game, a role-playing game published outside of traditional, "mainstream" means
Indie RPG Awards, annual, creator-based awards for Indie role-playing game products

Music
Independent music, subculture music that is independent of major producers
Indie dance, or alternative dance, a type of dance music rooted in indie rock and indie pop
Indie electronic, a music genre
Indie folk, a music genre that arose in the 1990s from singer/songwriters in the indie rock community influenced by folk and country music
Indie hip hop, hip hop music that primarily exists in the independent music scene
Indie music scene, localized indie music, listed by country
Indie pop, a genre of alternative pop music
Indie rock, a genre of alternative rock music
Independent record label, operates without major corporate funding
Indie Recordings, a Norwegian independent record label specializing in heavy metal

Media and art
Independent film, a film produced outside of the major film studios
Indiewood
Independent media, media free of influence by government or corporate interests
Indie art, fine arts made by artists independent of commercial fine arts establishments
Indie comics, independently published comics
Indie design, for handmade products by independent artisans
Indie literature, a book published outside mainstream publishing
Indie poster, or alternative poster, a poster created by a novice graphic designer
Small press, or indie press, a book or magazine publisher whose publications appeal to small, niche audiences, and are typically not distributed widely

Sports
Independent baseball league, a professional league in the U.S. and Canada not affiliated with Major League Baseball
Independent circuit, or indie circuit, in professional wrestling, comprising smaller promotions that do not have national TV contracts

Other uses
Independent business (unique and not part of a chain or larger corporation).
Independent soda, made by small, privately run companies
Non-denominational church, or independent church, a church unaffiliated with a denominational organization

See also
Independent (disambiguation)
Indi (disambiguation)
Indies (disambiguation)
Indy (disambiguation)
List of independent radio stations
The Independent (disambiguation)